BBC Radio Shropshire is the BBC's local radio station serving Shropshire.

It broadcasts on FM, DAB, digital TV and via BBC Sounds from studios on Boscobel Drive in Shrewsbury.

According to RAJAR, the station has a weekly audience of 67,000 listeners and a 4.8% share as of December 2022.

Transmitters
The 96 MHz FM signal from The Wrekin is the strongest, and can be heard from outside the county, especially along the M5 and M6 near Birmingham, as well as into western Staffordshire, southern Cheshire and Wrexham.

These three transmitters are for broadcasting to the south of the county, which has a hilly terrain that reduces the effectiveness of FM transmissions.

In addition, BBC Radio Shropshire also broadcasts on Freeview TV channel 721 in the BBC West Midlands region and streams online via BBC Sounds.

Programming
Local programming is produced and broadcast from the BBC's Shrewsbury studios from 6am – 10pm each day.

The station's late show, airing from 10pm-1am, originates from BBC Radio WM in Birmingham.

During the station's downtime, BBC Radio Shropshire simulcasts overnight programming from BBC Radio 5 Live and BBC Radio London.

Presenters
Notable current presenters include:

Jim Hawkins (Weekday daytime)
Ryan Kennedy(Friday afternoon, Saturday, Sunday morning)

Notable former presenters

 Tim Smith (now on BBC Radio 2)
 Ian Skelly (now on BBC Radio 3)
 Sybil Ruscoe (previously on BBC Radio 5 Live and BBC Radio 1)
 Eleanor Oldroyd (previously on BBC Radio 5 Live and BBC Radio 1)

References

External links
 BBC Radio Shropshire
 Media UK – BBC Radio Shropshire
 History of local radio in Shropshire
 MDS975's Transmitter Coverage
 Clun transmitter
 Hazler Hill transmitter
 Ludlow transmitter
 Turners Hill (Digital)
 Wrekin transmitter

Audio clips
 Test Transmission Audio
 2002 jingle
 Launch Audio

Shropshire
Radio stations in Shropshire
Radio stations established in 1985
1985 establishments in England